The yellow-fin perchlet (Ambassis elongatus) is a species of fish in the family Ambassidae. It is endemic to Australia where it has only been recorded from the  three rivers which drain into the Gulf of Carpentaria in northern Queensland. They are found in freshwater creeks and rivers with marginal vegetation, frequently recorded from freshwater streams that have quite high turbidity levels.

References 

yellow-fin perchlet
Freshwater fish of Queensland
yellow-fin perchlet
Taxa named by François-Louis Laporte, comte de Castelnau
Taxonomy articles created by Polbot
Taxobox binomials not recognized by IUCN